Manuel Cota Soto (June 5, 1954 – December 22, 2016) was a Mexican luchador, or professional wrestler best known under the ring name Mocho Cota. "Mocho" is Spanish for "mutilated", and Cota had lost two fingers. In his career, which began in 1979, he held both the Mexican National Welterweight Championship and the NWA World Welterweight Championship. He worked mainly for Empresa Mexicana de Lucha Libre / Consejo Mundial de Lucha Libre (EMLL / CMLL) throughout his career.

Professional wrestling career
Manuel Cota made his professional wrestling debut in 1979, choosing to wrestle under the ring name "Mocho Cota", a name he would use for his entire career. On November 12, 1982, he won the Empresa Mexicana de Lucha Libre (EMLL) promoted Mexican National Welterweight Championship by defeating Talismán. The title change set off a long running storyline feud between them that saw both men win Luchas de Apuestas against each other, seeing their opponents shaved bald after the matches. Cota's Mexican Welterweight title reign lasted for 265 days until he lost to Chamaco Valaguez on August 4, 1983. On January 27, 1984, he defeated Américo Rocca to win the NWA World Welterweight Championship. He lost the title to Valaguez on July 26, 1984. He died on December 22, 2016, aged 62.

Personal life
According to his son, "Mocho" earned his nickname by being amputated, losing two fingers and the top of another one, after an accident at a "Maquiladora" (a textile plant) working with a chopper before becoming a full-time wrestler. His brother wrestles as Guero Cota. One of his sons has become an established name of the Mexican Wrestling Company AAA taking up his famous father's name "Mocho Cota Jr." In February 2018, he and two partners: "Tito Santana (formerly known as Soul Rocker") and "Carta Brava Jr." known as "Poder del Norte" became champions of "Tercias (three wrestlers) of AAA.

Championships and accomplishments
Empresa Mexicana de Lucha Libre
Mexican National Welterweight Championship (1 time)
NWA World Welterweight Championship (1 time)

Luchas de Apuestas record

References

1954 births
2016 deaths
Mexican male professional wrestlers
Professional wrestlers from Sinaloa
20th-century professional wrestlers
21st-century professional wrestlers
NWA World Welterweight Champions